Brahim Ould Malha (Arabic: ابراهيم ولد مالحة; born 30 November 1976) is a Mauritanian former professional footballer who played as a striker. He scored five goals and made twenty-three appearances for the Mauritania national team.

Honours 
AS Garde Nationale

 Ligue 1 Mauritania: 1998
 Mauritanian President's Cup: 2001

References 

1976 births
Living people
Mauritanian footballers
Association football forwards
AS Garde Nationale players
ACS Ksar players
Super D1 players
Mauritania international footballers